Rolling Blackouts Coastal Fever, also sometimes known as Rolling Blackouts C.F., is an Australian indie rock band, formed in Melbourne in 2013. The band consists of three lead vocalists and guitarists — Fran Keaney, Tom Russo, and Joe White — alongside bassist Joe Russo and drummer Marcel Tussie.

Rising to prominence following the release of their second EP, The French Press, in 2017, the band has released three studio albums: Hope Downs (2018), Sideways to New Italy (2020) and Endless Rooms (2022).

History
Rolling Blackouts Coastal Fever was formed in Melbourne, Australia in 2013 by three guitarists; cousins Fran Keaney and Joe White, along with their longtime friend and musical partner Tom Russo. Soon after, the band recruited Tom Russo's brother Joe Russo on bass guitar, as well as Fran Keaney's housemate Marcel Tussie on drums. Their debut EP, Talk Tight, was released in 2016 on Ivy League Records. It was followed by their second EP, The French Press, which was mixed by Doug Boehm and released in 2017 on Sub Pop. They performed at the St Jerome's Laneway Festival on 29 January 2018, and their debut full-length album, Hope Downs, was released on 15 June 2018 on Sub Pop. Their second album, Sideways To New Italy, was released in 2020, again on Sub Pop.

Reception
Robert Christgau gave Talk Tight an A grade, writing that "If you like the [guitar] effect—and why not, it's beautiful—you'll gravitate to it on sound alone. But what I'm loving at least as much is lyrics that suit the bright white male culture the sound implies." He also compared the band's sound to that of the Go-Betweens, a comparison that has also been made by critics like Stephen Deusner. The band has also been aligned with Melbourne's dolewave scene.

According to Metacritic, The French Press has a score of 81 out of 100, based on 4 reviews, indicating that it has received "universal acclaim" from critics. One favorable review of the EP was written by Pitchfork Media's Stuart Berman, who gave it an 8.1/10 rating, writing that The French Press "shines just as bright as their last EP [Talk Tight], but the songs cast darker shadows." In a more mixed review, Landon MacDonald of PopMatters gave the EP a 5 out of 10 rating, writing that "Ultimately, this record is for indie rock fans alone and can’t stretch past the borders of the genre." Hope Downs has an 84/100 on Metacritic.

Members
 Fran Keaney – vocals, acoustic guitar (2013–present)
 Tom Russo – vocals, guitar (2013–present)
 Joe White – vocals, lead guitar, keyboards, harmonica (2013–present)
 Marcel Tussie - drums, percussion (2013–present)
 Joe Russo – bass guitar (2013–present)

Discography

Studio albums

EPs

Singles

Notes

Awards and nominations

AIR Awards
The Australian Independent Record Awards (commonly known informally as AIR Awards) is an annual awards night to recognise, promote and celebrate the success of Australia's Independent Music sector.

|-
| AIR Awards of 2019
| Hope Downs
| Best Independent Album
| 
|-

Australian Music Prize
The Australian Music Prize (the AMP) is an annual award of $30,000 given to an Australian band or solo artist in recognition of the merit of an album released during the year of award.

|-
| 2018
| Hope Downs
| Australian Music Prize
| 
|-

J Award
The J Awards are an annual series of Australian music awards that were established by the Australian Broadcasting Corporation's youth-focused radio station Triple J.

|-
| J Awards of 2018
| themselves
| Double J Artist of the Year
| 
|-
| J Awards of 2020
| themselves
| Double J Artist of the Year
| 
|-

Music Victoria Awards
The Music Victoria Awards, are an annual awards night celebrating Victorian music. They commenced in 2005.

! 
|-
| rowspan="2"| 2018
| Hope Downs
| Best Album
| 
| rowspan="2"| 
|-
| Rolling Blackouts Coastal Fever
| Best Band
| 
|-
| rowspan="2"| 2020
| Sideways to New Italy
| Best Album
| 
| rowspan="2"|  
|-
| themselves
| Best Band
| 
|-
| 2022
| Rolling Blackouts Coastal Fever
| Best Rock/Punk Work
| 
| 
|-

National Live Music Awards
The National Live Music Awards (NLMAs) are a broad recognition of Australia's diverse live industry, celebrating the success of the Australian live scene.

|-
| National Live Music Awards of 2020
| Joe Russo  (Rolling Blackouts Coastal Fever)
| Live Bassist of the Year
| 
|-

References

External links
 
 

2013 establishments in Australia
Australian indie rock groups
Jangle pop groups
Australian pop punk groups
Ivy League Records artists
Musical groups established in 2013
Musical groups from Melbourne
Sub Pop artists